= Three Seasons (band) =

Swedish rock band

- Origin: Sweden
- Genres: Blues rock, psychedelic rock, hard rock, progressive rock, folk rock
- Years active: 2009-present
- Labels: Transubstans Records
- Members: Sartez Faraj; Olle Risberg; Thomas Broman
- Past members: Christian Eriksson
- Website: www.threeseasonsmusic.com

Three Seasons is a Swedish rock band and trio made up of Sartez Faraj on vocals, Olle Risberg and Christian Eriksson, releasing rock music heavily influenced by 1960s and 1970s music. It is signed to the Swedish Transubstans record label.

The trio was formed in 2009 and their debut album was the double vinyl album Life's Road, with heavy blues rock, psychedelic jams, with touches of folk music, groovy funk and jazz. It was immediately followed by 7" single "Escape". Encouraged by the success, they released a second LP in 2012 entitled Understand the World and an arrangement with Dutch distributors Clear Spot to repress the initial vinyl for Life's Road and wider distribution throughout Europe. Three Seasons engaged on a wide European tour to market the albums. Greatly successful in Spain, the Spanish magazine Rock The Best Music chose the band as "one of the ten best 70′s-style bands of the whole century".

Three Seasons released a third album release in 2014 titled Grow, their highest charting release in Sweden.

== Members ==
- Sartez Faraj - vocals and guitar
- Olle Risberg - bass
- Christian Eriksson - drums

== Discography ==
=== Albums ===
Year	Album	Peak positions
Year	Album	SWE
2011	Life's Road	45
2012	Understand the World	–
2014	Grow	14
2017	Thing's Change	

=== Singles ===
- 2012: "Escape" (7" single)
